Carla Signoris (born 10 October 1960 in Genoa) is an Italian comedian and film, theatre and television actress.

In 2009 she was nominated to the David di Donatello for Best Supporting Actress for her performance in Ex.

As a dubber, she provided the Italian voice to Dory in Finding Nemo and Finding Dory and to Mrs. Krum in Klaus.

Filmography

Films

Television

External links
 

Italian comedians
Italian film actresses
Italian television actresses
Living people
Actors from Genoa
1960 births